This Left Feels Right is an album featuring new versions of Bon Jovi songs from previous albums. It was released in 2003 and charted at No. 14 on The Billboard 200. It's a "trip down memory lane" as Jon Bon Jovi described the album. It features revamped versions of many of Bon Jovi's biggest hits, often in a more somber style.  Many of the 80's hard hitting chart-rockers are presented in a different light as soulful ballads.

Release and Promotion
The 2003 rendition of "Wanted Dead or Alive" was released as a single and also had a promotional video produced, which had the same format as "Wanted Dead or Alive (Live version)", which was a single from the One Wild Night Live 1985–2001 album.

For the Russian and CIS release Olivia d'Abo's part in Livin' on a Prayer was recorded by Russian superstar Alsou in Bon Jovi's studio. This version was played on Russian radio stations to promote the release and got great reviews by Bon Jovi fans, but Olivia's version appeared on the Russian CD due to Universal Music Russia's decision.

New songs
Two new songs, "Last Man Standing" and "Thief of Hearts", were written and recorded for inclusion of the album. "Last Man Standing" was a song revealing lead singer Jon Bon Jovi's anger toward the state of the music industry. Bon Jovi believed that it would become more difficult for artists to find success in the music industry. This was Bon Jovi's reason for later removing the two new songs from the album, however Last Man Standing was later reworked and turned into a much more heavy aggressive rock song for inclusion on Bon Jovi's 2005 studio album, Have a Nice Day, a somewhat opposite effect of the This Left Feels Right project. The original version of "Last Man Standing" and "Thief of Hearts" were both later released as part of the box set 100,000,000 Bon Jovi Fans Can't Be Wrong and are also included as live versions on the This Left Feels Right Live DVD.

Track listing

Bonus DVD
A bonus DVD came free with some editions of This Left Feels Right, recorded at NRG Studios, Burbank, CA, December 3, 2002 for sessions@AOL. All songs were recorded acoustic. The Japanese bonuses were recorded at Yokohama Arena, Yokohama, Japan, January 19, 2003. "In These Arms" & "Heroes" were recorded live and "Right Side of Wrong" is a montage of videos recorded backstage and before the show that night.

The track listing is as follows:

 "Love for Sale"
 "Someday I'll Be Saturday Night"
 "Joey"
 "Misunderstood"
 "Diamond Ring"
 "Blood on Blood"
 "In These Arms" (Japan Limited Edition Bonus DVD)
 "Heroes" (David Bowie Cover) (Japan Limited Edition Bonus DVD)
 "Right Side of Wrong" (Montage Video) (Japan Limited Edition Bonus DVD)

Personnel
Jon Bon Jovi – lead vocals, acoustic rhythm guitar
Richie Sambora – acoustic lead guitar, background vocals, talkbox
Tico Torres – drums, percussion
David Bryan – keyboards, piano, background vocals

with

 Hugh McDonald – acoustic bass, background vocals
Olivia d'Abo – vocals on "Livin' on a Prayer"

Charts

Weekly charts

Year-end charts

Certifications

References

Bon Jovi albums
2003 albums
Albums produced by Patrick Leonard
Albums produced by Richie Sambora